The Andranotsimisiamalona River is located in northern Madagascar. Its sources are situated in the Ambohitra Massif; it flows into the Saharenana River above Antananandrenitelo.

References 

Rivers of Madagascar
Rivers of Diana Region